Keith Williams (born ), better known as Honey Boy, is a Jamaican reggae singer best known for his recordings in the 1970s who is regarded as one of the pioneers of lovers rock.

Biography
Williams was born in Saint Elizabeth Parish . He moved to the United Kingdom in the late 1960s, living in Oxford before settling in London. He found work as a backing vocalist with Laurel Aitken before recording his debut single "Jamaica" for Trojan in 1971 and for Junior Lincoln's Banana label, beginning with the "Homeward Bound" single. Several singles followed, credited to Honey Boy and other pseudonyms such as Happy Junior and Boy Wonder. He contributed "Jamaica" to the 1971 live album Trojan Reggae Party, and his first album, This Is Honey Boy, was released in 1973. 

In the mid-1970s he worked with former Studio One musician Winston Curtis, who had relocated to the UK and moved into production. He also recorded for Count Shelley. With the advent of lovers rock in the mid-1970s, Honey Boy became a major figure in the scene, having several hits on the reggae charts in 1977. In 1980 he recorded the Arise album with members of Aswad. In 2002, Honey Boy was featured vocalist on "Always There" on UB40's album UB40 Present the Fathers of Reggae.

Album discography
This Is Honey Boy (1973), Count Shelley
Sweet Cherries Impossible Love (1974), Cactus
Taste of Honey (1975), Cactus
Strange Thoughts (1976), Trojan
Lovers (1976), Third World
Dark End of the Street (1978), Diamond
Arise (1980), Diamond
Love You Tonight (1995)
Master Piece (2000) Cactus
The Gospel and I, Pt.2 (2007), Jet Star

References

External links
 

1950s births
Living people
People from Saint Elizabeth Parish
Jamaican reggae musicians
Jamaican male singers